Thomas Henry Paton (8 November 1881 – 1922) was a Scottish footballer who played in the Football League for Derby County and Sheffield United.

References

1881 births
1922 deaths
Scottish footballers
Sportspeople from East Kilbride
Footballers from South Lanarkshire
English Football League players
Scottish Football League players
Scottish Junior Football Association players
Association football defenders
Larkhall Thistle F.C. players
Hamilton Academical F.C. players
Royal Albert F.C. players
Rangers F.C. players
Vale of Leven F.C. players
Derby County F.C. players
Sheffield United F.C. players
St Mirren F.C. players
St Mirren F.C. non-playing staff
Association football coaches
Airdrieonians F.C. (1878) players
St Johnstone F.C. players
Cowdenbeath F.C. players